"Best of Order" is a song written by Scottish musician, singer and songwriter David Sneddon and Scott MacAlister. It was released as the third single from his debut album, Seven Years - Ten Weeks, on 11 August 2003 in the United Kingdom. It charted at No. 19 in the UK Singles Chart.

Track listing
Both of the CD single releases featured the main song but CD 1 also included the music video. CD 2 contained a live version of his debut single, "Stop Living the Lie" and an acoustic version of "Fly", while CD1 included two new tracks, "I'm on Your Side" and "Wasting Your Life Away". CD 2 also had a live video of "Stop Living the Lie".

UK CD 1
"Best of Order"
"I'm on Your Side"
"Wasting Your Life Away"
"Best of Order (music video)"

UK CD 2
"Best of Order"
"Fly" (acoustic)
"Stop Living the Lie" (live)
"Stop Living the Lie" (live video)

Chart positions

References

David Sneddon songs
2003 singles
2003 songs
Mercury Records singles
Songs written by David Sneddon
Songs written by Scott MacAlister